Kadamattom Church is an ancient Malankara Orthodox Syrian Church, located in Kadamattom near Kolenchery, in Ernakulam district, Kerala

History
The church is believed to have been established in the 9th century by Mar Sabor.

Location
Kadamattom church is situated next to National Highway 49 (India) (Kochi-Madurai National Highway) between Kolenchery and Muvattupuzha towns in the Ernakulam District. While traveling from Kochi towards the east, the church is seen on the north side of the road  beyond the Kolenchery Medical College Junction. While traveling from Muvattupuzha towards Kolenchery, the church lies  after the Peruvammuzhi Junction.

Features
On entering the church, on the left there is a photograph of Mar Sabor Metropolitan, the Reverend Paulose, who was the mentor of Kadamattathu Kathanar.  It is believed that Mar Sabor, a Persian high priest established the church with the help of Kartha, the then local ruler of Kadamattom. Mar Sabro was not only a theologian but also a conjurer.  He stayed in a hut with a poor widow and her only son Paulose.  Paulose assisted Mar Sabor for years and later Paulose was ordained a priest.

The tomb of Mar Thoma IX (formerly Pakalomattom Iype Kathanar) lies on the left side just outside the Madbaha or altar room.

A 9th-century stone Persian cross with four equal-size arms sits on the right wall of the Madbaha or altar room. The arms are tipped with floral designs and is claimed to have been made by Mar Sabor. Around the cross is engraved a Pahlavi inscription.

Kadamattom feast is one of the major festivals observed during the January – February period. It marks the death anniversary of Kadamattathu Kathanar.

References

External links

 Official Website of St. George  Orthodox Church, Kadmattom

Churches in Ernakulam district